Stories Told & Untold is the twelfth studio album by the English band Bad Company. The album was released on 15 October 1996, through East West. It was their last album with lead vocalist Robert Hart. This album features newly arranged re-recordings of Bad Company's greatest hits in a more  Americana inspired style, along with new songs.

Track listing

Personnel
Bad Company
 Robert Hart −  vocals
 Mick Ralphs − lead guitar, slide guitar, keyboards
 Dave Colwell - guitar
 Rick Wills − bass guitar, backing vocals
 Simon Kirke − drums
Additional musicians 
 Josh Leo - acoustic guitar, production 
 Vince Gill - electric guitar
 Dean Howard, Richie Sambora - guitars
 Alison Krauss - fiddle, backing vocals 
 Chris Dunn, Doug Moffet, Vinnie Ciesielski, William Fanning - horns 
 Matt Rollings - piano
 John Hobbs - piano, organ, synthesizer
 Bill Cuomo, Carl Marsh, Jeff Bova - synthesizer
 Fats Kaplin - accordion
 Greg Morrow, Jim Capaldi - percussions
 Bekka Bramlett, Kim Carnes, Timothy B. Schmit - chorus, backing vocals
 Kim Carnes - vocals on "Silver, Blue & Gold" and "Shooting Star"
 Richie Sambora - lead guitar, rhythm guitar on "Shooting Star"

Production
 Bad Company - producers
 Andy Jackson - engineer
 Amy Hughes, Sandy Jenkins - engineers, mixing, tracking
 Ben Fowler - engineer, mixing
 Ted Jensen - mastering
 John Kunz, John Thomas - tracking
 Aubrey Powell, Jim Shea, Simon Fowler - photography 
 Jennifer Roddie - art direction

References

1996 albums
Bad Company albums
East West Records albums